Sir Dudley Ryder  (4 November 1691 – 25 May 1756), of Tooting Surrey,  was a British lawyer, diarist and politician, who sat in the House of Commons from 1733 until 1754 when he was appointed Chief Justice of the King's Bench.

Early life
Ryder was the second son of Richard Ryder, a draper of Hackney, Middlesex, and his second wife Elizabeth Marshall, daughter of William Marshall of Lincoln's Inn. He studied at a dissenting academy in Hackney and the University of Edinburgh, Scotland and Leiden University in The Netherlands. He went to the Middle Temple in 1713 (where he kept a diary from 1715–16, in which he minutely recorded “whatever occurs to me in the day worth observing”). In 1719, he was called to the Bar. He married Anne Newnham, daughter of Nathaniel Newnham of Streatham, Surrey in November 1733.

Career
Ryder was returned as Member of Parliament for St Germans at a by election on 1 March 1733. He was also made Solicitor General by Sir Robert Walpole in 1733. At the 1734 British general election, he switched to Tiverton where he was returned unopposed as MP. He was appointed as Attorney General in 1737. At the creation of the Foundling Hospital in London in 1739 he was one of the founding governors. In 1740, he was knighted.  He topped the poll in a contest at the 1741 British general election and was returned unopposed again in 1747. On 2 May 1754 he was made a Privy Councillor and Chief Justice of the King's Bench, a post he held until his death. He did not stand for parliament at the 1754 general election. The King refused his application for a peerage until he had served in office for two years.  A patent creating him a peer was signed by the King on 24 May 1756, but Ryder died the following day and was in no position to kiss hands to take it up.

Horace Walpole thought Ryder "a man of singular goodness and integrity; of the highest reputation in his profession, of the lowest in the House, where he wearied the audience by the multiplicity of his arguments; resembling the physician who ordered a medicine to be composed of all the simples in a meadow, as there must be some of them at least that would be proper".

Ryder died leaving one son Nathaniel who became Baron Harrowby.

References
 William Matthews (ed.), The Diary of Dudley Ryder 1715-1716 (London, 1939).
 Brenner, Maurice, ‘Discourse and Reality: the many worlds of Dudley Ryder, 1715-1716’ (Ipswich, 2012)

Notes

External links

1691 births
1756 deaths
Attorneys General for England and Wales
British MPs 1727–1734
British MPs 1734–1741
British MPs 1741–1747
British MPs 1747–1754
Knights Bachelor
Lord chief justices of England and Wales
Members of the Middle Temple
Members of the Parliament of Great Britain for Tiverton
Members of the Privy Council of Great Britain
Solicitors General for England and Wales
Members of the Parliament of Great Britain for St Germans
Dudley
18th-century diarists